Mazosia lueckingii is a species of foliicolous (leaf-dwelling) lichen in the family Roccellaceae. Found in India, it was formally described as a new species in 2008 by Krishna Pal Singh and Athokpam Pinokiyo. The lichen has a verrucose (warty) thallus with brown, hairless verrucae, a black hypothallus, and ascospores that measure 34–45 by 4–7 μm with 4 or five septa. The specific epithet lueckingii honours German-born lichenologist Robert Lücking, who, according to the authors, "has made remarkable contributions to the taxonomy and ecology of foliicolous lichens".

References

Roccellaceae
Lichen species
Lichens described in 2008
Lichens of India